Slavski kolač is a traditional Serbian cake (a type of yeast bread). It is made for the Orthodox Christian celebration of Slava, a UNESCO's Representative List of the Intangible Cultural Heritage of Humanity. The parish priest visits the family to consecrate the kolač and red wine, and to light a beeswax candle stamped with an image of the saint. 

Often extended family and friends are invited to the celebration. Wine is poured over the cake, and it is cut or broken by members of the family before lunch.

Significance 
The custom of Slava and the importance of the celebration cake are found only among Serbs. It celebrates home liturgy, domesticity, family gatherings, and family tradition. Slavski kolač, along with the candle and a wheat dish such as žito (koljivo), are present at all Slava celebrations and are considered the crucial elements.

The cake symbolizes of the body of Jesus, and the wine with which the cake is eaten represents his blood. Traditionally a woman made the bread the day before the celebration, after bathing, dressing in clean clothing, saying the Lord's Prayer, and crossing herself. Tradition calls for the dough to be made with consecrated water.

During the coronavirus pandemic, health and religious authorities advised that it was not necessary to take the cake to church, that singing was not necessary for the celebration, and that the gatherings should be limited to household members.

Description 
Traditionally, braided dough is wrapped around the rim and a dough cross is pressed into the center of the dough, dividing the loaf into quarters. Each quarter gets further decoration, such a Cyrillic "C", which stands for samo, sloga, Srbina, spasava, meaning "Only unity will save the Serbs". Around the rim the letters "ИС ХС НИ КА" (Cyrillic), an abbreviation for "Jesus Christ Conquers". Every baker has her own style of decoration.

Consecration 
The parish priest visits the family to consecrate the kolač and red wine, and to light a beeswax candle stamped with an image of the saint. Some families instead take the cake to church to be consecrated. 

After the cake is consecrated, wine is poured over the cake. The woman of the household cuts it into quarters and turns it cut-side up. It is further cut into pieces by other family members and oldest or most important guests.

Gallery

See also 

 Patron saint day
 Kolach (bread)
 Korovai

References 

Baked foods
Serbian cuisine
Serbian culture